The balafon is a gourd-resonated xylophone, a type of struck idiophone. It is closely associated with the neighbouring  Mandé, Senoufo and Gur peoples of West Africa, particularly the Guinean branch of the Mandinka ethnic group, but is now found across West Africa from Guinea to Mali. Its common name, balafon, is likely a European coinage combining its Mandinka name  bala with the word  fôn 'to speak' or the Greek root phono.

History
Believed to have been developed independently of the Southern African and South American instrument now called the marimba, oral histories of the balafon date it to at least the rise of the Mali Empire in the 12th century CE. Balafon is a Manding name, but variations exist across West Africa, including the balangi in Sierra Leone and the gyil of the Dagara, Lobi and Gurunsi from Ghana, Burkina Faso and Ivory Coast. Similar instruments are played in parts of Central Africa, with the ancient Kingdom of Kongo denoting the instrument as palaku.

Records of the balafon go back to at least the 12th century CE. In 1352 CE, Moroccan traveller Ibn Battuta reported the existence of the ngoni and balafon at the court of Malian ruler Mansa Suleyman.

European visitors to West Africa described balafons in the 17th century largely identical to the modern instrument. The Atlantic Slave Trade brought some balafon players to the Americas. The Virginia Gazette records African-Americans playing a barrafoo in 1776, which appears to be a balafon. Other North American references to these instruments die out by the mid-19th century.

The balafon has seen a resurgence since the 1980s in the growth of African Roots Music and World Music. Most famous of these exponents is the Rail Band, led by Salif Keita. Even when not still played, its distinctive sound and traditional style has been exported to western instruments. Maninka from eastern Guinea play a type of guitar music that adapts balafon playing style to the imported instrument.

Etymology
In the Malinké language balafon is a compound of two words: balan is the name of the instrument and fô is the verb to play. Balafon therefore is really the act of playing the bala.

Bala still is used as the name of a large bass balafon in the region of Kolokani and Bobo Dioulasso. These bala have especially long keys and huge calabashes for amplification. Balani is then used as the name of the high pitched, small balafon with small calabashes and short (3 to 4 cm long) keys. The balani is carried with a strap and usually has 21 keys, while the number of keys on a bala vary with region.

Construction

A balafon can be either fixed-key (where the keys are strung over a fixed frame, usually with calabash resonators underneath) or free-key (where the keys are placed independently on any padded surface). The balafon usually has 17–21 keys, tuned to a tetratonic, pentatonic or heptatonic scale, depending on the culture of the musician.

The balafon is generally capable of producing 18 to 21 notes, though some are built to produce many fewer notes (16, 12, 8 or even 6 and 7). Balafon keys are traditionally made from kosso rosewood, dried slowly over a low flame, and then tuned by shaving off bits of wood from the underside of the keys. Wood is taken off the middle to flatten the key or the end to sharpen it.

In a fixed-key balafon, the keys are suspended by leather straps just above a wooden frame, under which are hung graduated-size calabash gourd resonators. A small hole in each gourd is covered with a membrane traditionally of thin spider's-egg sac filaments (nowadays more usually of cigarette paper or thin plastic film) to produce the characteristic nasal-buzz timbre of the instrument, which is usually played with two gum-rubber-wound mallets while seated on a low stool (or while standing using a shoulder or waist sling hooked to its frame).

Regional traditions
As the balafon cultures vary across West Africa, so does the approach to the instrument itself. In many areas the balafon is played alone in a ritual context, in others as part of an ensemble. In Guinea and Mali, the balafon is often part of an ensemble of three, pitched low, medium and high. In Cameroon, six balafon of varying size perform together in an orchestra, called a komenchang. An Igbo variation exists with only one large tuned key for each player. And while in most cases a single player hits multiple keys with two mallets, some traditions place two or more players at each keyboard.

The Susu and Malinké people of Guinea are closely identified with the balafon, as are the other Manding peoples of Mali, Senegal, and the Gambia. Cameroon, Chad, and even the nations of the Congo Basin have long balafon traditions.

Often, balafon players will wear belled bracelets on each wrist, accentuating the sound of the keys.

In some cultures the balafon was (and in some still is) a sacred instrument, playable only by trained religious caste members and only at ritual events such as festivals, royal, funerial, or marriage celebrations. Here the balafon is kept in a temple storehouse, and can only be removed and played after undergoing purification rites. Specific instruments may be built to be only played for specific rituals and repertoires. Young adepts are trained not on the sacred instrument, but on free-key pit balafons.

Gyil

The gyil ( or ) is the name of a buzzing pentatonic balafon common to the Gur-speaking populations in northern Ghana, Burkina Faso, southeastern Mali and northern Ivory Coast in West Africa. Among Mande populations in Ghana like the Ligbi (Numu), Bissa and Dyula, the same instrument is known as bala. The gyil is the primary traditional instrument of the Dagara people of northern Ghana and Burkina Faso, and of the Lobi of Ghana, southern Burkina Faso, and Ivory Coast. The gyil is usually played in pairs, accompanied by a calabash gourd drum called a kuor. It can also be played by one person with the drum and the stick part as accompaniment, or by a soloist. Gyil duets are the traditional music of Dagara funerals. The instrument is generally played by men, who learn to play while young; however, there is no restriction on gender. It is also played by the Gurunsi people of the Upper East Region of Ghana, as well as neighbouring Gurunsi populations across the border in south and central Burkina Faso. A dance related to the gyil is the Bewaa.

The gyil's design is similar to the balaba or balafon used by the Mande-speaking Bambara, Dyula and Sosso peoples further west in southern Mali and western Burkina Faso, as well as the Senoufo people of Sikasso, a region that shares many musical traditions with those of northern Ivory Coast and Ghana. It is made with 14 wooden keys of an African hardwood called liga attached to a wooden frame, below which hang calabash gourds. Spider web silk covers small holes in the gourds to produce a buzzing sound and antelope sinew and leather are used for the fastenings. The instrument is played with rubber-headed wooden mallets.

Cameroon

During the 1950s, bars sprang up across Cameroon's capital to accommodate an influx of new inhabitants, and soon became a symbol for Cameroonian identity in the face of colonialism. Balafon orchestras, consisting of 3–5 balafons and various percussion instruments became common in these bars. Some of these orchestras, such as Richard Band de Zoetele, became quite popular in spite of scorn from the European elite.

The middle of the 20th century saw the popularisation of a native folk music called bikutsi. Bikutsi is based on a war rhythm played with various rattles, drums and balafon. Sung by women, bikutsi featured sexually explicit lyrics and songs about everyday problems. In a popularised form, bikutsi gained mainstream success in the 1950s. Anne-Marie Nzie was perhaps the most important of the early innovators. The next bikutsi performer of legendary stature was Messi Me Nkonda Martin and his band, Los Camaroes, who added electric guitars and other new elements.

Balafon orchestras had remained popular throughout the 50s in Yaoundé's bar scene, but the audience demanded modernity and the popular style at the time was unable to cope. Messi Martin was a Cameroonian guitarist who had been inspired to learn the instrument by listening to Spanish language-broadcasts from neighboring Equatorial Guinea, as well as Cuban and Zairean rumba. Messi changed the electric guitar by linking the strings together with pieces of paper, thus giving the instrument a damper tone that emitted a "thudding" sound similar to the balafon.

Guinea
The balafon, kora (lute-harp), and the ngoni (the ancestor of the banjo) are the three instruments most associated with griot bardic traditions of West Africa. Each is more closely associated with specific areas, communities, and traditions, though all are played together in ensembles throughout the region. Guinea has been the historic heartland of solo balafon. As griot culture is a hereditary caste, the Kouyaté family has been called the keepers of the balafon, and twentieth century members of this family have helped introduce it throughout the world.

The Sosso Bala 

The :Fr:Sosso Bala is a balafon, currently kept in the town of Niagassola, Guinea that is reputed to be the original balafon, constructed over 800 years ago. The Epic of Sundiata, a story of the formation of the Mali Empire, tells that a griot (praise-singer) named Bala Faséké Kouyaté convinced Sosso king Sumanguru Kante to employ him after sneaking into Sumanguru's palace and playing the sacred instrument. Sundiata Keita, founder of the Mali Empire overthrew Sumanguru, seized the balafon, and made the griot Faséké its guardian. This honor is said to have passed down through his family, the Kouyatés, and conveys upon them mastership of the balafon to this day.

Regardless of the truth of this story, the Sosso Bala is an instrument of great age, and was named by UNESCO as one of the Nineteen Masterpieces of the Oral and Intangible Heritage of Humanity in 2001.

Senegal 
The title of the Senegalese National Anthem is "Pincez Tous vos Koras, Frappez les Balafons" (Everyone strum your koras, strike the balafons).

Mali

A modern festival devoted to the balafon, the Triangle du balafon, now takes place annually at Sikasso in Mali.

Famous players and ensembles 
Famous balafon players have included:
 Madou Kone, Balafon Master from Burkina Faso, living in Vienna, Austria
 Richard Bona, Cameroonian jazz musician
 Abdou Karim Diabate "Tunkaraba" King of Balafon, from the village of Tabatto, Guinea-Bissau
 Djiby Diabaté
 Kélétigui Diabaté, playing for Habib Koité's Bamada group
 Mamadou Diabate, Knight of the National Order of Burkina Faso (2016), Winner of the "Grand Prix" & "Prix de la Virtuosite de Festival Triangle du Balafon" in Mali (2012), Winner of the Austrian World Music Award (2011)
 Lassana Diabaté, Malian musician known for work with Toumani Diabaté's Symmetric Orchestra and Afrocubism
 Modibo Diabaté, from Mali
 Zerika Djabate, Bissau-Guinean musician
 Djiguiya, percussion band from Burkina Faso
 Danny Elfman of Oingo Boingo
 Les Freres Coulibaly, Burkina-based balafon ensemble
 Stefon Harris, American jazz musician
 Dominic Howard of Muse used a balafon on the band's second album, Origin of Symmetry
 Mory Kanté, early in his career
 Aly Keita, Aly Keita and the Magic Balaphone, Malian balafon player
 Gertrude Kilian, DVD "The Balafon with Aly Keita & Gert Kilian", "Balafon Beat" / Verlag Zimmermann 
 Lawrence Killian, American jazz musician
 Mahama Konaté of John Cena, Burkina-based balafon ensemble
 Balla Kouyate, from Mali/Guinea, whose father, Sekou "Filani" Kouyaté, is the current guardian of the Sosso Bala
 Mamadi Kouyate, from Mali/Guinea, (Germany since 2015), whose grandfather Sékou "Filani" Kouyaté, is the current guardian of the Sosso Bala
 El Hadj Djeli Sory Kouyaté
 N'Faly Kouyate of the Afro Celt Sound System
 Adam Malik, Burkina-based balafon ensemble
 Dave Mann, jazz percussionist, played with the Dave Brubeck Group
 Neba Solo (Senufo balafon group, led by Souleymane Traoré) from Sikasso
 Mama Ohandja, Cameroonian composer and performer to his country
 Qasim, Burkina-based balafon ensemble
 Pharoah Sanders, American jazz musician
 Saramaya, Burkina-based balafon ensemble
 Raheel Sharif, British band leader originally from Senegal
 Bill Summers, American jazz musician, performing with Quincy Jones, Herbie Hancock, and Los Hombres Calientes
 Lonnie Liston Smith, American jazz musician
 Rokia Traoré, Malian singer, guitarist, and band leader
 Le Troupe Saaba, Burkina-based balafon ensemble
 Momo Werner Wevers, German balafon player, plays solo and with the "Ensemble M.Pahiya" (balafon and classical guitar)
 N'Camara Abou Sylla (Guinea; Les Ballets Africains)

See also

 Music of Guinea
 Music of Mali
 Marimba, covers the modern instrument which developed independently in both South America and southern Africa.

References

Sources
 "BALAFON BEAT" by Gert Kilian, edition Zimmermann / Germany http://www.gert-kilian.com/bb/index.html
 "The Balafon with Aly Keita & Gert Kilian", edition "improductions" / Paris http://www.gert-kilian.com/DVDbalafon.html
 "Das magische Balafon" by Mamadi Kouyaté, Ursula Branscheid-Kouyaté, http://www.djembe-kora.de/mamadi.html

Further reading 
 Lynne Jessup. The Mandinka Balafon: an Introduction with Notation for Teaching. Xylo Publications, (1983)  .
 Eric Charry. Mande Music: Traditional and Modern Music of the Maninka and Mandinka of Western Africa. Chicago Studies in Ethnomusicology. University Of Chicago Press (2000).  .
 Adrian Egger, Moussa Hema: Die Stimme Des Balafon - La Voix Du Balafon. Schell Music, .
 Gert Kilian "Balafon Beat", Verlag Zimmermann, Germany
 Gert Kilian "The Balafon with Aly Keita & Gert Kilian", édition "improductions" / Paris
 "Das magische Balafon" by Mamadi Kouyaté, Ursula Branscheid-Kouyaté / Germany / LEU-Verlag, Neusaess DVD

External links

 Cora Connection: What is a balaphone?
 Gallery of balafon photos, including the construction process.
 The Making of a Mofu-Gudur Balafon An article with photos and illustrations on the construction of a balafon in northern Cameroon.
 http://www.djembe-kora.de/trommelbau.html a clip about the making of a balafon in Niagassola / Guinea

West African musical instruments
Stick percussion idiophones
Pitched percussion instruments
African percussion instruments
Burkinabé musical instruments
Chadian musical instruments
Gambian musical instruments
Guinean musical instruments
Malian musical instruments
Senegalese musical instruments
Intangible Cultural Heritage of Humanity
Sacred musical instruments